Cornelis "Kees" Krijgh Sr. (20 August 1921 – 15 June 2007) was a Dutch footballer who played his entire career for BVV Den Bosch. He competed in the men's tournament at the 1948 Summer Olympics.

Career
Born in 's-Hertogenbosch, Krijgh Sr. played for BVV Den Bosch his entire career as a defensive midfielder. In 1948, he won the league title with the club. He was capped three times for the Netherlands; his international debut was during the 1948 Summer Olympics. This match, in the preliminary round against Ireland, ended in a 3–1 win. Despite this, the Dutch team was eliminated in the first round.

During his career he was also called "de kleine Kees Krijgh" ("the small Kees Krijgh"). He was an uncle of Kees Krijgh Jr., who played for PSV and Cercle Brugge in the 1970s.

Death
On 15 June 2007, Krijgh Sr. died at the age of 85 in the Oosterhof nursing home. His wife, Suze already preceded him. "After a life characterised by simplicity, cordiality, concern and love," could be read in the obituary.

Honours
BVV
Netherlands Football League Championship: 1947–48

References

External links
 

1921 births
2007 deaths
Dutch footballers
Netherlands international footballers
Olympic footballers of the Netherlands
Footballers at the 1948 Summer Olympics
Sportspeople from 's-Hertogenbosch
Footballers from North Brabant
Association football midfielders
FC Den Bosch players